Kenneth R. Weiss (born May 28, 1957) is an investigative journalist for the Los Angeles Times.

Weiss was born in Covina, California, and he graduated from University of California, Berkeley in 1981 with a B.A. in Folklore. There he was editor-in-chief for the college newspaper, The Daily Californian, during his senior year.

Weiss, reporter Usha Lee McFarling, and photographer Rick Loomis of the L.A. Times shared the Pulitzer Prize for Explanatory Reporting in 2007, citing "their richly portrayed reports on the world's distressed oceans, telling the story in print and online, and stirring reaction among readers and officials."

Awards
2006 George Polk Award
2007 Pulitzer Prize for Explanatory Reporting
2007 Grantham Prize Winner
2007 Carl Sagan Award for Public Understanding of Science

Selected works
"Fish Farms Become Feedlots of the Sea", The Los Angeles Times, KENNETH R WEISS, 9 December 2002
"Bush to Protect Island Waters ", The Los Angeles Times, June 15, 2006
"Cruise Line Pollution Prompts Legislation", The Los Angeles Times, KENNETH R WEISS, 18 August 2003
"The rise of slime", The New Internationalist, January 2007, Issue 397
"Beyond 7 billion""Five Part Series on Challenges Posed by Rising World Population] The Los Angeles Times, KENNETH R WEISS, 22 July 2012

References

External links
"How Journalists Work with Ken Weiss and John Vande Wege", USCAnnenberg, November 13, 2007
 Pulitzer Winner Ken Weiss at UCSB (2007) at University of California, Santa Barbara

American male journalists
Los Angeles Times people
Pulitzer Prize for Explanatory Journalism winners
George Polk Award recipients
UC Berkeley College of Letters and Science alumni
Living people
1957 births